Palade, Pallade, Paladi and Pallady are Romanian surnames. Notable people with the surname include:

George Emil Palade, Romanian-American cell biologist
George D. Pallade, Romanian politician
Radu Paladi
Theodor Pallady

Romanian-language surnames